Salvatore Gatto (born 17 May 1984 in Termini Imerese) is an Italian racing driver. He has competed in such series as International Formula Master and the Italian Formula Three Championship.

References

External links
 

1984 births
Living people
People from Termini Imerese
Italian racing drivers
International Formula Master drivers
Italian Formula Three Championship drivers
Sportspeople from the Province of Palermo

Target Racing drivers
German Formula Three Championship drivers